Njësiti guerril is a 1969 Albanian action war film drama directed and written by Hysen Hakani with :sq:Muharrem Skënderi. The film starred Saimir Kumbaro and Ndrek Luca.

Cast
Pëllumb Dërvishi
Drita Haxhiraj
Saimir Kumbaro
Petrit Llanaj
Marie Logoreci
Ndrek Luca

Plot
Operation "Black Snake" World War II, Italian spy agency (SIM) through Ludovic tries to infiltrate the ranks of the city's guerrilla units. They aim to discover and destroy the leaders and all resistance. Agent Ludovik is discovered and thus the entire fascist plan fails.

References

External links
 

1969 films
1960s war drama films
Albanian-language films
Albanian black-and-white films
Albanian drama films
1969 drama films
Albanian World War II films